A bronze statue of  is installed along the Rotonda de los Jaliscienses Ilustres, in Centro, Guadalajara, in the Mexican state of Jalisco.

In the early morning of 6 November 2017, two men were arrested after being caught removing the engraved letters.

References

External links

 

Outdoor sculptures in Guadalajara
Rotonda de los Jaliscienses Ilustres
Sculptures of men in Mexico
Statues in Jalisco
Vandalized works of art in Mexico